The 2022 Campeonato Brasileiro Série D was a football competition held in Brazil, equivalent to the fourth division. The competition began on 17 April and ended on 25 September 2022.

Sixty-four teams competed in the tournament. Sixty teams qualified from their state leagues and cups, and four relegated from the 2021 Campeonato Brasileiro Série C (Jacuipense, Oeste, Paraná and Santa Cruz).

The four semi-finalists, Amazonas, América de Natal, Pouso Alegre and São Bernardo, were promoted to the 2023 Campeonato Brasileiro Série C.

In the finals, América de Natal won their first title after defeating Pouso Alegre 2–1 on aggregate.

Teams

Federation ranking
The number of teams from each state was chosen based on the CBF State Ranking.

Participating teams

Competition format
In the group stage, the 64 teams were divided into eight groups of eight organized regionally. Top four teams qualified for the round of 32. From the round of 32 on the competition was played as a knock-out tournament with each round contested over two legs.

Group stage
In the group stage, each group was played on a home-and-away round-robin basis. The teams were ranked according to points (3 points for a win, 1 point for a draw, and 0 points for a loss). If tied on points, the following criteria would be used to determine the ranking: 1. Wins; 2. Goal difference; 3. Goals scored; 4. Head-to-head (if the tie was only between two teams); 5. Fewest red cards; 6. Fewest yellow cards; 7. Draw in the headquarters of the Brazilian Football Confederation (Regulations Article 13).

The top four teams qualified for the round of 32.

Group A1

Group A2

Group A3

Group A4

Group A5

Group A6

Group A7

Group A8

Final stages
The final stages were played on a home-and-away two-legged basis. For the round of 16, semi-finals and finals, the best-overall-performance team hosted the second leg. If tied on aggregate, the away goals rule would not be used, extra time would not be played, and the penalty shoot-out would be used to determine the winners (Regulations Article 18).

For the quarter-finals, teams were seeded based on the table of results of all matches in the competition. The top four seeded teams hosted the second leg.

The four quarter-finals winners were promoted to 2023 Série C.

Round of 32
The round of 32 was a two-legged knockout tie, with the draw regionalised. The matches were played from 23 July to 1 August.

Matches

|}

Round of 16
The matches were played from 6 to 14 August.

Matches

|}

Quarter-finals
The draw for the quarter-finals was seeded based on the table of results of all matches in the competition for the qualifying teams. The teams were ranked according to points. If tied on points, the following criteria would be used to determine the ranking: 1. Wins; 2. Goal difference; 3. Goals scored; 4. Fewest red cards; 5. Fewest yellow cards; 6. Draw in the headquarters of the Brazilian Football Confederation (Regulations Article 15).

Quarter-finals seedings

Matches
The matches were played from 20 to 28 August.

|}

Semi-finals
The matches were played from 3 to 11 September.

Matches

|}

Finals
The matches were played on 18 and 25 September.

Matches

|}

Top goalscorers

References

Campeonato Brasileiro Série D seasons
4
2022 in Brazilian football